Kuch Elqar (also Romanized as Kūch Elqār; also known as Kūch and Kooch Mo’men Abad) is a village in Kahshang Rural District, in the Central District of Birjand County, South Khorasan Province, Iran. At the 2016 census, its population was 178, in 53 families.

References 

Populated places in Birjand County